Peter Stolt (born August 15, 1978) is an American curler from Plymouth, Minnesota.

Stolt competes with his wife Maureen Stolt in mixed doubles competition. Together they have won the United States Mixed Doubles Curling Championship once (in 2013), and finished in second place three times. Their national championship in 2013 earned them the right to represent the US at the 2013 World Mixed Doubles Curling Championship, where they finished in fourth place in the Yellow Pool.

References

External links

1978 births
Living people
People from Plymouth, Minnesota
American male curlers
Sportspeople from Wisconsin